Jean-Michel Damian (8 September 1947 – 1 November 2016) was a French radio and television music journalist. He hosted and produced radio programmes on France Musique from 1980 to 2009. He was the author of two books.

Early life
Jean-Michel Damian was born on 8 September 1947, in Chambéry, Savoie, France.

He learned to play the piano, the harpsichord and the pipe organ as a child. He graduated from Sciences Po.

Career
Damian was a radio journalist. He began his career as a music journalist on France Culture in the early 1970s. He was also a book reviewer Politique Hebdo, a radio programme on France Culture. He joined France Inter in 1975, where he was a music reviewer on Temps de vivre, hosted by Jacques Pradel, until 1977. He was the host of Espace musical, a television programme on France 3, in 1978.

Damian was a music journalist on France Musique, a French radio station, from 1980 to 2009. He became the host of L’Air du temps de la musique in 1980. He was subsequently the host and producer of Désaccord parfait, Les Imaginaires, Cordes sensibles, and Ce soir on dîne.

Damian was the author of two books, including a novel, Scène dans le bleu.

Death
Damian died during the course of an operation in a Paris hospital on 1 November 2016, aged 69.

Works

References

1947 births
2016 deaths
People from Chambéry
Sciences Po alumni
French music journalists
French radio journalists
French radio producers
French radio presenters
20th-century French journalists
21st-century French journalists
French non-fiction writers
20th-century French novelists
French male novelists
Radio France people
20th-century French male writers
French male non-fiction writers